Live My Life may refer to:
"Live My Life" (song), a 2012 song by Far East Movement with vocals by Justin Bieber
Live My Life (album), a 2009 album by Boris
"Live My Life", a 1987 Boy George song from the album Sold
"Live My Life", a 2001 song by N.O.R.E. featuring Ja Rule from the album God's Favorite
"Live My Life (Leave Me Alone)", a song from the 2002 Cam'ron album Come Home with Me

See also
I Live My Life, a 1935 American comedy-drama film